Joseph Bowie (born October 17, 1953) is an American jazz trombonist and vocalist. The brother of trumpeter Lester Bowie, Joseph is known for leading the jazz-punk group Defunkt and for membership in the Ethnic Heritage Ensemble.

Career 

Bowie was greatly influenced by his older brothers, saxophonist Byron Bowie and trumpeter Lester Bowie. His first international tour was with Oliver Lake of the Black Artists Group in 1971. During this time in Paris, he worked with Alan Silva, Frank Wright, and Bobby Few. He also worked with Dr. John in Montreaux in 1973. He moved to New York City, and with the help of Off Broadway Theater impresario Ellen Stewart he established La Mama children's theater. He performed with Cecil Taylor, Human Arts Ensemble, Nona Hendryx, Leroy Jenkins, Vernon Reid, Stanley Cowell, Sam Rivers, Philippe Gaillot, Dominique Gaumont  and Ornette Coleman. In 1976 he moved to Chicago, where he led bands for Tyrone Davis and other R&B artists.

Returning to New York City in 1978 he began singing with punk and funk musician James Chance and the Contortions. Defunkt was born during that time. During the next 25 years, Defunkt recorded 15 albums. Bowie has collaborated with Jean-Paul Bourelly and Jamaaladeen Tacuma. He has performed "big band funk" arrangements with Ed Partyka at Music School Lucerne, Barbary Coast Ensemble at Dartmouth College, JazzArt Orchestra, and the HR Frankfurt Radio Big Band. The first Defunkt Big Band debuted in 1999 in New York City at the Texaco Jazz Festival sponsored by the Knitting Factory.

In 2003, he moved to the Netherlands where he met Hans Dulfer and was introduced to the Dutch music scene. He has performed performs with Hans and Candy Dulfer and also performs as guest with the Saskia Laroo Band, Naked Ears, Monsieur Dubois, Emergency Room, Funkateer, Seven Eleven, and Almost Three.

In 2014 he produced Sax Pistols Allergy for the U.S (ZIP Records) with lyricist Hilarius Hofstede and musicians Yuri Honing, Luc Houtcamp, Chazzy Green, Bart Wirtz, Koen Schouten, James White and Defunkt rhythm section of Kim Clarke, Tobias Ralph, and Rocco Zifarelli.  In 2009 he created Defunkt Mastervolt with Paris-based musicians Linley Marthe, Rocco Zifarelli, Emma Lamadji, Michael Lecoq, and Jon Grandcamp. The album Defunkt Mastervolt was released in 2015 on ZIP Records.

Robin van Erven Dorens directed the documentary In Groove We Trust about Bowie's life.

Discography

As leader 
 Heroes (DIW, 1990)

As sideman 
With Lester Bowie
 1974 Fast Last!
 1999 American Gumbo

With James Chance
 1981 Live in New York
 2000 White Cannibal
 2003 Irresistible Impulse

With Defunkt
 1980 Defunkt
 1982 Thermonuclear Sweat
 1988 In America
 1992 Crisis
 1994 Cum Funky
 1994 Live & Reunified
 1994 Live at the Knitting Factory NYC
 1995 A Blues Tribute: Jimi Hendrix & Muddy Waters
 2016 Live at Channel Zero

With Ethnic Heritage Ensemble
 Ancestral Song (Silkheart, 1988)
 Hang Tuff (Open Minds, 1991)
 Dance with the Ancestors (Chameleon, 1993)
 21st Century Union March (Silkheart, 1997)
 The Continuum (Delmark, 1997)
 Papa's Bounce (CIMP, 1998)
 Freedom Jazz Dance (Delmark, 1999)

With Oliver Lake
 1975 Heavy Spirits
 2003 Cloth
 2017 Live at A-Space 1976

With others
 1972 Red, Black & Green, Solidarity Unit, Inc.
 1973 In Paris, Aries 1973, Black Artists Group
 1975 For Players Only, Leroy Jenkins
 1975 Fresh, Frank Lowe
 1975 The Flam, Frank Lowe
 1976 Ntu: Point from Which Creation Begins, Oliver Lake
 1977 Streets of St. Louis, Charles Bobo Shaw
 1992 Under the Wire, Michael Marcus
 1993 Highlights: Live in Vienna, Vienna Art Orchestra
 1994 Sacred Common Ground, Don Pullen
 1997 Junk Trap, Charles Bobo Shaw
 1999 Inspiration, Sam Rivers
 1999 Culmination, Sam Rivers
 2000 Beyond the Sky, Yusef Lateef
 2001 Funky Donkey, Vols. 1 & 2, Luther Thomas
 2002 Just Add Water, Bobby Previte
 2002 Trance Atlantic (Boom Bop II), Jean-Paul Bourelly
 2003 H.Con.Res.57/Treasure Box, Alan Silva
 2007 Transmigration, Kahil El'Zabar
 2009 Funked Up!, Candy Dulfer

References

External links 

 Official website

Musicians from St. Louis
American jazz trombonists
Male trombonists
1953 births
Living people
DIW Records artists
American Buddhists
Nichiren Buddhists
Jazz musicians from Missouri
21st-century trombonists
21st-century American male musicians
American male jazz musicians
Ethnic Heritage Ensemble members
Human Arts Ensemble members
Sackville Records artists